Chris Martin (born September 1, 1974) is a former professional American football player who played defensive back for  one season for the Chicago Bears. Martin was a three-year starter, four-year letterman as cornerback for Northwestern University from 1992-95. He was a member of the Big Ten Championship season and Rose Bowl team in 1995.

References

1974 births
Players of American football from Tampa, Florida
American football safeties
Northwestern Wildcats football players
Chicago Bears players
Living people
Jesuit High School (Tampa) alumni